Coprosma spathulata is a shrub that is native to New Zealand. An example occurrence of this species is within the Hamilton Ecological District in the North Island within a forest dominated by Nothofagus and rimu, where understory associates include Blechnum discolor and Doodia media.

References
 C. Michael Hogan. 2009. Crown Fern: Blechnum discolor, Globaltwitcher.com, ed. N. Stromberg
 New Zealand Institute. 1908. Transactions and Proceedings of the New Zealand Institute, Published by J. Hughes, Printer, vol. 40
 Walter Reginald Brook Oliver. 1935. The genus Coprosma, no. 132, Published by The Museum, 1935

Line notes

spathulata